Pazhakulam is a town in Pathanamthitta district in Kerala, India. This village comes under Adoor taluk.

Location
Pazhakulam is located near Adoor town in Pathanamthitta district.  Nearby villages are Erathu, Pandalam Thekkekara, Kadampanadu, Palamel, Pandalam municipality and Adoor municipality. Noorul Huda Juma Masjid Pazhakulam, Pazhakulam Punthalaveetil temple, Thengumthara Uma Maheshwara temple, St. Gregorieos Orthodox Church, Thiruhridaya Catholic Church, St. Mathews Malankara Catholic Church are the major religious institutions. Govt. I.P.S. Pazhakulam, St. Stephens English Medium School are the major educational institutions. BSNL telephone exchange is situated in Thengumthara junction. The Life Line hospital is 1.5 km away from Pazhakulam.

Churches
Assemblies of God in India
India Pentecostal Church of God

Mosque
Pazhakulam Noorul Huda Muslim Jamath

Temples

[Pazhakulam Punthalaveetil Temple](http://www.pazhakulampunthalaveetilamma.blogspot.com)
.Thengumthara Uma maheshwara temple.(https://www.facebook.com/Thengumthara-UMA-Maheshwara-Temple-145530415601754/).

Schools
 St.Stephens. school Pazhakulam
 Pazhakulam Government  LP School

References 

Villages in Pathanamthitta district